The 2011 BMW Malaysian Open was a tennis tournament played on outdoor hard courts. It was the second edition of the Malaysian Open and was an International tournament on the 2011 WTA Tour. This was also be the first edition of the tournament to be sponsored by BMW. The tournament took place from February 28 to March 6 at the Bukit Kiara Equestrian and Country Resort. 

The event was headlined by the participation of World No. 5 and French Open reigning champion Francesca Schiavone, World No. 15 Marion Bartoli, former World No. 1 Dinara Safina, the defending champion and World No. 22, Alisa Kleybanova and World No. 30 Lucie Šafářová among others.

Entrants

Seeds

1 Rankings as of February 21, 2011.

Other entrants
The following players received wildcards into the main draw:
 Jarmila Groth
 Urszula Radwańska
 Francesca Schiavone

The following players received entry from the qualifying draw:

 Anne Kremer
 Lu Jingjing
 Tetiana Luzhanska
 Sun Shengnan

Finals

Singles

 Jelena Dokić defeated  Lucie Šafářová, 2–6, 7–6(11–9), 6–4.
 It was Dokić's first title of the year, and the sixth of her career. It was her first title since winning Birmingham in 2002.

Doubles

 Dinara Safina /  Galina Voskoboeva defeated  Noppawan Lertcheewakarn /  Jessica Moore, 7–5, 2–6, [10–5].

External links
 Official website
 ITF tournament edition details
 Players announcement

Tennis tournaments in Malaysia
Malaysian Open
Malaysian Open (tennis)
2011 in Malaysian tennis